The 1973 Cork Intermediate Hurling Championship was the 64th staging of the Cork Intermediate Hurling Championship since its establishment by the Cork County Board in 1909. The draw for the opening round fixtures took place at the Cork Convention on 28 January 1973.

On 22 July 1973, Cloughduv won the championship following a 2-09 to 2-05 defeat of Blackrock in the final at Páirc Uí Chonaill. This was their third championship title overall and their first title since 1941.

Cloughduv's Connie Kelly was the championship's top scorer with 1-21.

Team changes

From Championship

Promoted to the Cork Senior Hurling Championship
 Mallow

Regraded to the Cork Junior Hurling Championship
 Cloyne

To Championship

Promoted from the Cork Junior Hurling Championship
 Newcestown

Results

First round

Quarter-finals

Semi-finals

Final

References

Cork Intermediate Hurling Championship
Cork Intermediate Hurling Championship